The 2016 season is the 140th season of competitive soccer in Canada.

National teams 

When available, the home team or the team that is designated as the home team is listed in the left column; the away team is in the right column.

Senior Men

2018 FIFA World Cup Qualifiers 

 finishes in third place; does not advance to fifth round of qualifying.

Friendlies

Senior Women

2016 Olympic Games 

 finishes in  third place.

2016 Olympic Games Qualifiers 

 finishes in  second place; qualifies for the 2016 Summer Olympics.

2016 Algarve Cup 

 finishes in  first place.

Friendlies

Domestic leagues

Men

Major League Soccer 

Three Canadian teams (Montreal Impact, Toronto FC, and Vancouver Whitecaps FC) play in this league, which also contains 17 teams from the United States.  It is considered a Division 1 league in the Canadian soccer league system.

Overall standings

North American Soccer League 

Two Canadian teams (FC Edmonton and Ottawa Fury FC) play in this league, which also contains 12 teams from the United States.  It is considered a Division 2 league in the Canadian soccer league system.

Overall standings

United Soccer League 

Three Canadian teams (FC Montreal, Toronto FC II, and Whitecaps FC 2) play in this league, which also contains 25 teams from the United States.  It is considered a Division 3 league in the Canadian soccer league system.

Eastern Conference

Western Conference

League1 Ontario 

16 teams play in this league, all of which are based in Canada.  It is considered a Division 3 league in the Canadian soccer league system.

 Eastern Conference

 Western Conference

 League Championship
The league champion is determined by a single-match series between the top-ranked teams from the western and eastern conferences.

Première Ligue de soccer du Québec 

Seven teams play in this league, all of which are based in Canada.  It is considered a Division 3 league in the Canadian soccer league system.

Premier Development League 

Six Canadian teams (TFC Academy, K-W United FC, Thunder Bay Chill, WSA Winnipeg, Calgary Foothills FC, and Victoria Highlanders) play in this league, which also contains 57 teams from the United States.  It is considered a Division 4 league in the Canadian soccer league system.
Great Lakes Division

Heartland Division

Northwest Division

Canadian Soccer League 
 
Fourteen teams play in this league, all of which are based in Canada. It is a Non-FIFA league previously sanctioned by the Canadian Soccer Association and is now a member of the Soccer Federation of Canada (SFC).

First Division 

Second Division

Women

National Women's Soccer League 

No Canadian teams play in this league, though eleven players from the Canada women's national soccer team play on its teams.  It is considered a Division 1 league in the Canadian soccer league system.

Overall standings

Women's Premier Soccer League 

103 teams play in this league, one of which is based in Canada (NSGSC).  It is considered a Division 2 league in the Canadian soccer league system.

League1 Ontario 

Nine teams play in this league, all of which are based in Canada.  It is considered a Division 3 league in the Canadian soccer league system.

Domestic cups

Men

Canadian Championship 

The Canadian Championship is contested by men's teams at the division 1 & 2 level.

Inter-Provincial Cup 
The Inter-Provincial Cup is a two-legged home-and-away series at the division 3 level played between the season champions of League1 Ontario and the Première Ligue de soccer du Québec.

CS Mont-Royal Outremont wins 3–2 on aggregate.

Challenge Trophy 

The Challenge Trophy is a national cup contested by men's teams at the division 4 level and below.

Women

Jubilee Trophy  

The Jubilee Trophy is a national cup contested by women's teams at the division 4 level and below.

Canadian clubs in international competition

2016–17 CONCACAF Champions League 

 Vancouver Whitecaps FC advances to knockout stage.

References

External links 
 Canadian Soccer Association

 
Seasons in Canadian soccer